Villa Zeno is a patrician villa at Cessalto, Veneto, northern Italy, and is the most easterly villa designed by Italian Renaissance architect Andrea Palladio. The building is near the highway between Venice and Trieste, but was built to face a canal which served as the primary means of arrival.

History 

Palladio's building for the Zeno family has been dated to the 1550s.  It is illustrated in I quattro libri dell'architettura, the architect's influential publication of 1570, and has similarities to some of the other villas described there such as the Villa Saraceno.  It is also reminiscent of Villa Caldogno Nordera, which is attributed to Palladio, but is not included in I quattro libri.

Palladio appears to have incorporated an existing building, and his villa has had several modifications.  Its Palladian features include a facade characterised by a triple-arched loggia. The roof is capped with period clay tiles, and the structure is of brick covered with stucco, typical of Palladio who was able to achieve great buildings with what are commonly regarded as inferior materials.

Conservation
In 1996, it was designated by UNESCO as part of the World Heritage Site "City of Vicenza and the Palladian Villas of the Veneto".
The villa is in need of restoration.

See also
 Palladian Villas of the Veneto
 Palladian architecture

External links
 Description of the villa from www.cisapalladio.org
 Architectural Reference drawings of The Villas of Palladio

Andrea Palladio buildings
Zeno
House of Zeno
Palladian villas of Veneto